Shawn Christopher Burr (July 1, 1966 – August 5, 2013) was a Canadian professional ice hockey left winger. Burr played in the NHL for parts of 16 seasons from 1985 to 2000.

Playing career
Burr was drafted in the first round (seventh overall) by the Detroit Red Wings in the 1984 NHL Entry Draft. Burr played 878 career NHL games with the Red Wings, Tampa Bay Lightning and the San Jose Sharks, scoring 181 goals and 259 assists for 440 points. He also garnered 1,069 penalty minutes.

In 2007, Burr was elected president of the Detroit Red Wings Alumni Association and was active in its efforts to raise money for children's charities in Metro Detroit.

Burr was the president of the Port Huron Icehawks IHL hockey organization.

Personal 
Burr was born in Sarnia, Ontario, Canada and lived there until his hockey career began.

On February 27, 2011, it was reported that Burr was diagnosed with myeloid leukemia, which in some cases requires a bone marrow transplant. He successfully completed chemotherapy and was reportedly cancer free. However, it returned the following year.

Death
Burr died on August 5, 2013, after a fall in his home in St. Clair, Michigan caused massive brain trauma. It is unknown if the fall was related to the lasting side effects of his cancer treatments.

Burr was survived by his wife Amanda and their two daughters.

Career statistics

Regular season and playoffs

International

Awards
1983-84 OHL Rookie of the Year
1985-86 OHL Second All-Star team

References

External links

1966 births
2013 deaths
Accidental deaths from falls
Accidental deaths in Michigan
Adirondack Red Wings players
Canadian ice hockey centres
Detroit Red Wings draft picks
Detroit Red Wings players
Sportspeople from Sarnia
Kentucky Thoroughblades players
Kitchener Rangers players
Manitoba Moose (IHL) players
National Hockey League first-round draft picks
San Jose Sharks players
Tampa Bay Lightning players
Ice hockey people from Ontario
People from St. Clair, Michigan
Sportspeople from Metro Detroit